The American Broadcasting Company coined the term Afterschool Special in 1972 with a series of television films, usually dealing with controversial or socially relevant issues, that were generally broadcast in the late afternoon and meant to be viewed by school-age children, particularly teenagers. The specials were generally broadcast four to six times during the school year, pre-empting local programming that would usually follow the network schedule in the late afternoon hours. ABC's series ran from 1972 to 1997.

Competitors
CBS distributed its own productions as the CBS Afternoon Playhouse (later known as CBS Schoolbreak Special). It also had a program called Famous Classic Tales, which aired Australian cartoons that were adapted from literature books (similar to Family Classic Tales). NBC had afterschool programs under the umbrella title Special Treat. ABC had the ABC Afterschool Special; similar programs included The ABC Saturday Superstar Movie and the ABC Weekend Special.

Legacy
The cult TV show Strangers with Candy and its 2005 feature film adaptation, featuring Amy Sedaris as an ex-con, prostitute, and junkie, spoofs afterschool special conventions.

See also
 Degrassi (franchise)
 Last of the Curlews – The very first ABC Afterschool Special (1972), and one of a very few animated ones.
 Schoolhouse Rock!
 Public information film – In the UK, extended versions of these were shown in schools. These were often about safety.
 Very special episode
 WonderWorks – Produced several afterschool-type specials for PBS

References

External links
 Complete list of ABC After School Specials at the Internet Movie Database
 Complete list of CBS Schoolbreak Specials at the Internet Movie Database
 Partial list of NBC Special Treat episodes at the Internet Movie Database
 Reviews of a DVD collection of ABC After School Specials
 "The Strange Afterlife of the After School Special" by Joanna Weiss, The Boston Globe, January 1, 2006
 "My Dad Lives in a Downtown Hotel: The Subtle Brilliance of the After School Special" by Marisa Meltzer, Slate, July 20, 2006

1970s American television specials
1970s in television
1970s neologisms
1980s in television
1990s in television
Television specials
Television terminology